Kathipara Junction is an important road junction in Chennai, India. It is located at Alandur at the intersection of the Grand Southern Trunk Road, Inner Ring Road, Anna Salai and Mount-Poonamallee Road. Kathipara flyover is the largest cloverleaf flyover in South Asia.

Construction
The junction used to be a roundabout with a statue of Jawaharlal Nehru. A cloverleaf grade separator was constructed as part of the NHDP to ease traffic congestion at the junction. It is the first of three grade separators being built on the Inner Ring Road to improve connectivity between the various National Highways radiating from the city, the other two being the one on Koyambedu junction (NH 4) near the Chennai Mofussil Bus Terminus and the one at Padi Junction (NH 205). The main span of the flyover connecting Inner Ring Road and GST Road was opened to traffic on 9 April 2008 and the entire section was opened to the public on 26 October 2008. Landscaping work worth  on the 40,000 sq m area will be taken up after Chennai Metro work is completed.

Urban Square
Urban Square a metro rail initiative to build facilities under the clover leaf loops of the Kathipara Junction being developed by a private contractor. It will have a bus terminal where MTC and out- station buses can halt to pick up and drop passengers, kids play area, food court, open air theater, retail shops, office space, washrooms, vehicular parking facility, kiosks, ATMs and facilities for horticulture spread across an area of 54,400 sqm.

This development is estimated to cost around 140 million and will be funded by the Chennai Metropolitan Development Authority and implementation and maintenance will be taken care of by the Chennai Metro Rail.

Gallery

See also

Koyambedu Junction
Padi Junction
Maduravoyal Junction
Madhya Kailash Junction

References

Road interchanges in India
Bridges and flyovers in Chennai
Bridges completed in 2008
2008 establishments in Tamil Nadu